Ian Fitzgibbon (born 1962 in Dublin) is an Irish film and television actor/director. He is perhaps best known for directing Spin the Bottle, A Film with Me in It and the Comedy Central UK show Threesome, and for the role of Fr. Jessup in Father Ted.
In 2014, he won an IFTA for director television drama for the Sky sitcom Moone Boy.

Filmography (partial)
Stuck (5-part series, television 2022)
 Hullraisers (television, 2022)
 Damned (television, 2016)
 Nurse (television, 2015)
 Trying Again (television, 2014)
 Moone Boy (television, 2014)
 Threesome (television, 2011–2012)
 Death of a Superhero (2011)
 Perrier's Bounty (2009)
 A Film with Me in It (2008)
 Spin the Bottle (2003)
 Fergus's Wedding (television, 2002)
 Paths to Freedom (television, 2000)
 Prime Suspect (television, 1992) Bill "Jonesy" Jones

References

External links

CV at agents
2013 Interview from the Irish Film and Television Network

Irish film directors
Living people
1962 births
Alumni of RADA